Christiaan Justus Enschedé  (9 December 1788 in Haarlem – 26 June 1829 in Haarlem) was a Haarlem newspaper editor and printer.

Biography
He was a son of Johannes Enschedé Jr. and Johanna Elisabeth Swaving. For some time he was a partner in the family company. On 9 August 1827 in Rotterdam he married Adriana Maria van Dalen (Rotterdam, 10 May 1801 – Haarlem, 31 January 1858) the daughter of Abraham Cornelis Dalen and Jacoba Catharina Durselen.

References

 Het huis Enschedé 1703–1953, Joh. Enschedé en Zonen, Haarlem 1953
 Enschede aan het Klokhuisplein, (Dutch), by Just Enschede, De Vrieseborch, Haarlem, 1991, 
 Catalogue de la bibliothèque (manuscrits, ouvrages xylographiques, incunables, ouvrages d'estampes, livres curieux et rares) formée pendant le 18e siècle par Messieurs Izaak, Iohannes et le Dr. Iohannes Enschedé, sale catalog for the auction of Enschedé III's collection by Frederik Muller and Martinus Nijhoff, 9 December 1867; version on Google books

1788 births
1829 deaths
People from Haarlem
Dutch businesspeople
Dutch art collectors
Bibliophiles
Dutch printers
Dutch newspaper editors